Tinkoff Bank, formerly Tinkoff Credit Systems is a Russian commercial bank based in Moscow and founded by Oleg Tinkov in 2006. The bank does not have branches and is considered a neobank. It is the second largest provider of credit cards in Russia, and is the world's largest digital bank, as measured by number of customers.
, Tinkoff Bank has had its credit rating withdrawn in compliance with sanctions imposed as a result of Russia's invasion of Ukraine.

History
Entrepreneur Oleg Tinkov founded Tinkoff Credit Systems in 2006, after working with consultants from Boston Consulting Group to see if a bank without branches could work in Russia. Tinkov invested around $70 million in the bank, and based the bank on the American Capital One bank; Tinkov took over the Khimmashbank corporate bank in Moscow. In 2007, the bank received investment from Goldman Sachs. In 2013, Tinkoff was listed on the London Stock Exchange, raising $1.1 billion, and in the same year, the bank was named the Bank of the Year by the Financial Times' Banker magazine.

In 2013, a Russian named Dmitry Agarkov attempted to sue the bank for 24 million roubles ($724,000); Agarkov had edited a 2008 credit card agreement with the bank, and his edits had been accepted by the bank. The legal action was later withdrawn by both the parties after an undisclosed settlement was reached.

In 2015, the bank was officially renamed Tinkoff Bank, and was also named the Best Internet Retail Bank in Russia by the Global Finance magazine.

In December 2019, Tinkoff launched Russia's first fully digital ATM, without keyboard or the ability to print receipts. In the 2019 financial year, Tinkoff announced revenue increases of 33%. Tinkoff Bank has updated its app to include cinema and hotel tickets, as well as booking holidays through the bank's subsidiary, Tinkoff Travel. In March 2020, shares in the bank fell after Oleg Tinkov, who owns a 40% share in the bank, was indicted by the US Department of Justice. Also in 2020, the bank helped fund German mobile banking startup Vivid Money, which is supported by solarisBank and Visa.

After the sale of part of the stake and the conversion of the remaining 35% into ordinary shares in early 2021, Oleg Tinkov ceased to be the majority shareholder of the TCS Group.

In February 2021, Tinkoff Bank took first place in the ranking of the Top 50 Russian banks, according to The Banker. The position is due to the increasing role of online banking during the Covid-19.

29 March 2021 Tinkoff Bank filed a lawsuit in the Moscow Arbitration Court. The bank accused the mobile operator MTS of unfairly setting tariffs for sending SMS and demanded compensation in the amount of more than 1 billion roubles. MTS disagrees with the accusations. A similar claim, but for 436.8 million roubles, against another operator of the Russian "big three" company, VimpelCom, was filed at the end of May.

In the April rating The World's Best Banks from Forbes, Tinkoff Bank was ranked fifth among Russian banks.

In October 2021, Tinkoff launched e-commerce division (part of Tinkoff Business), headed by Ilya Kretov, new arrival and ex-CEO at eBay Russia.

In October 2021, Central Bank of Russia granted the license to "Tinkoff Capital" asset management company, the part of "Tinkoff bank", allowing portfolio management. Since its foundation in June 2019, "Tinkoff Capital" has been permitted to manage investment, private pension and private equity funds. As per October 2021, net capital of "Tinkoff Capital" are estimated at 30 billion dollars. In the same month, TCS Group, managing company of "Tinkoff Bank", founded "Tinkoff Global PTE" in Singapore, focused on markets of South-East Asia according to group's international expansion strategy. In the same month, the Central Bank of Russia added Tinkoff Bank in the list of systemically important credit institutions as a result of bank's overweight development and customer base.

In March 2022, Tinkoff Bank had its credit rating withdrawn in compliance with sanctions imposed as a result of Russia's invasion of Ukraine.

Sponsorships

From 2006 to 2008, Tinkoff were the sponsors of the Tinkoff Credit Systems UCI Professional Continental cycling team. In June 2012, Tinkoff became the co-sponsors of the Team Saxo Bank, with the team being renamed Saxo Bank–Tinkoff Bank (later Saxo-Tinkoff, Tinkoff-Saxo and Tinkoff). For the 2016 cycling season, Tinkoff Bank became the sole sponsors of the cycling team.

In 2018, Tinkoff became the sponsor of the Russian comedy TV competition KVN with a contract for three years. The same year, Tinkoff sponsored a Depeche Mode concert in Moscow.

In September 2019, Tinkoff also became sponsor of tennis player Daniil Medvedev.

From February 2020 to May 2022, Tinkoff was the title sponsor of the Russian Premier League.

References

External link

Banks of Russia
Online banks
Banks established in 2006
Companies based in Moscow
Companies listed on the London Stock Exchange